The 2013 Lotto-Belisol Belgium Tour  is the second edition of the Lotto-Belisol Belgium Tour, previous called Lotto-Decca Tour, a women's cycle stage race in Belgium. The tour will be held from 23 to 26 August 2013. The tour has an UCI rating of 2.2.

Stages

Stage 1
23-08-2013 – Warquignies to Angreau,  Team time trial (TTT)

Stage 2
24-08-2013 – Angreau to Angreau,

Stage 3
25-08-2013 – Nijlen to Nijlen,

Stage 4
26-08-2013 – Geraardsbergen to Geraardsbergen,

Classification leadership

Classification standings

General Classification

Source

Team Classification

Source

Sprints Classification

Source

Mountains Classification

Source

Young rider classification

Source

Belgian Rider Classification

Source

References

External links

Lotto-Belisol Belgium Tour
Lotto-Belisol Belgium Tour
Lotto-Decca Tour